German submarine U-489 was a Type XIV supply and replenishment U-boat ("Milchkuh") of Nazi Germany's Kriegsmarine during World War II.

Her keel was laid down on 28 January 1942, by Germaniawerft of Kiel as yard number 558. She was launched on 24 December 1942 and commissioned on 8 March 1943, with Leutnant zur See Adalbert Schmandt in command. He remained in command throughout the boat's short career.

The U-boat's service life commenced with the 4th U-boat Flotilla from 8 March until 31 July 1943 for training. She then served, for operations, with the 12th flotilla.

Design
German Type XIV submarines were shortened versions of the Type IXDs they were based on. U-489 had a displacement of  when at the surface and  while submerged. She had two shafts and two propellers.

U-489 was not fitted with torpedo tubes or deck guns, but had two  SK C/30 anti-aircraft guns with 2500 rounds as well as a  C/30 guns with 3000 rounds. The boat had a complement of fifty-three.

Operational career
U-489s only patrol began with her departure from Kiel on 22 July 1943. She headed for the Atlantic by way of the so-called Faeroes Gap between Iceland and the Faroe Islands, north of the British Isles.

She was attacked by a PBY Catalina flying boat of No. 190 Squadron RAF on 3 August. During the action, the 'Cat' was hit twice and retired. Her crew were obliged to jettison depth charges and on their return, found the rudder cables almost severed. Her place was taken by a Lockheed Hudson of 269 Squadron, which succeeded in damaging U-489.

Although as a supply boat, she avoided combat, she was lost on her first patrol when on 4 August, she was attacked by a Canadian Sunderland flying boat of No. 423 Squadron RCAF, south-east of Iceland. The Sunderland was shot down, five of the eleven man crew were killed; U-489 was sunk. 53 of her crew escaped.

References

Bibliography

External links
 

German Type XIV submarines
U-boats commissioned in 1943
U-boats sunk in 1943
World War II submarines of Germany
1942 ships
World War II shipwrecks in the Atlantic Ocean
Ships built in Kiel
U-boats sunk by Canadian aircraft
Maritime incidents in August 1943